The Ballou–Weatherhead House (or "Welcome Weatherhead House") is an historic house on Tower Hill Road in Cumberland, Rhode Island.
The house is a -story, center-chimney dwelling built on Cumberland Hill around 1748 and expanded during the Federal period, around 1799, at which point the style was changed to Federal architecture. The house has a broad gable roof, a simple entry in the asymmetrical side-gable façade, a central entry at the gable end, and a side wing. The house contains high-quality joinery and trim, likely executed by one of two house-wrights associated with the property.

The house was listed on the National Register of Historic Places on June 25, 1993.

See also
National Register of Historic Places listings in Providence County, Rhode Island

References

Houses completed in 1748
Houses on the National Register of Historic Places in Rhode Island
Houses in Cumberland, Rhode Island
National Register of Historic Places in Providence County, Rhode Island
1748 establishments in the Thirteen Colonies